Troy Gavin Pratt (born 21 October 1968) is a former speedway rider from England.

Speedway career 
Pratt reached the final of the British Speedway Championship in 1993. He rode in the top tier of British Speedway from 1988 to 2002, riding for various clubs.

References 

Living people
1968 births
British speedway riders
Cradley Heathens riders
King's Lynn Stars riders
Lakeside Hammers riders
Rye House Rockets riders